The Amsterdam–Rhine Canal (Dutch: Amsterdam-Rijnkanaal) is a canal in the Netherlands that was built to connect the port and capital city of Amsterdam to the main shipping artery of the Rhine. Its course follows a generally southeasterly direction as it goes through the city of Utrecht towards Wijk bij Duurstede where it intersects the Lek branch of the Rhine and then continues on to the river Waal near Tiel, with a branch, the Lek Canal, to the Lek near Nieuwegein.
The Amsterdam-Rhine Canal is the world's most frequented artificial waterway with an annual average of 100,000 ships.

Bridges

Rail bridges (with nearest train station on the west and east bank):
between Diemen/Diemen-Zuid and Weesp
 Demkaspoorbrug, between Maarssen and Utrecht Centraal
 Vleutensespoorbrug, between Utrecht Leidsche Rijn and Utrecht Centraal
between Culemborg and Houten
between Tiel and Kesteren

References 

Canals in the Netherlands
Canals opened in 1952
Canals in the Rhine–Meuse–Scheldt delta
Canals in North Holland
Canals in Utrecht (province)
Canals in Amsterdam
Buildings and structures in Utrecht (city)
Transport in Utrecht (city)
Wijk bij Duurstede